Takeuti may refer to:
Takeuti conjecture, a conjecture by Gaisi Takeuti
The Japanese family name Takeuchi, including:
Gaisi Takeuti (1926–2017), Japanese mathematician